SWI swissinfo.ch is a multilingual news and information platform produced by the Swiss Broadcasting Corporation (SRG SSR). Its content is Swiss-centred, with top priority given to in-depth information on politics, the economy, the arts, science, education, and direct democracy. Switzerland's international political, economic and cultural relations are other key points of focus. The website is available in ten languages.

History 
In the mid-1990s, economic circumstances forced swissinfo.ch to take a new strategic direction. The internet was advancing fast, heralding a new era for the producing journalists and the Swiss Radio International (SRI) audience alike. The German, French, English and Portuguese sites went online in 1999. The Italian, Japanese and Spanish sites followed in 2000, with Arabic going live on 1 February 2001 and Chinese in September of the same year. Within just two years, the internet platform for expatriate Swiss was already better known than SRI's short-wave radio services.

On 21 March 2005, the Board of Directors of SRG SSR decided to reduce the swissinfo.ch service significantly. At the time, the decision was not final and still had to be confirmed by the regulatory body – the Federal Office of Communications – and the Swiss Federal Council. That decision was expected in the autumn of 2005. SRG SSR's intention to cut swissinfo.ch back to a minimum triggered an enormous response from users and readers. There was widespread lack of understanding for the move. The SRG SSR plan for the future was to produce a reduced service in English only. This service was to be integrated into SR DRS, the radio portion of what is today the German-language broadcaster SRF. Only specific information for Swiss people living abroad would be provided in Switzerland's national languages. One journalist would be responsible for each language, and the service would be produced by one of the existing SRG SSR enterprise units. In the end, the public had their way, preventing the reduction in services. In the summer of 2007, the Federal Council issued swissinfo.ch with a new charter to provide specific and clearly defined internet-focused news, information, and entertainment services.

Christoph Heri, the editor-in-chief of swissinfo.ch, retired on 31 March 2008 after a 30-year media career, the last six years of which were spent with the swissinfo.ch editorial team. Peter Schibli became the new editor-in-chief of swissinfo.ch on 1 January 2008. Schibli, who holds a doctorate in law. He was charged with fulfilling the content aspects of the Federal Council charter and with positioning swissinfo.ch as a leading nine-language news and information platform for both expatriate Swiss and an international audience with an interest in Switzerland. In November 2008, Schibli became the director of swissinfo.ch. The new editor-in-chief Christophe Giovannini served from November 2008 to February 2015. In 2013, swissinfo.ch welcomed Russian as 10th language of the information platform. In January 2016, Larissa M. Bieler (b. 1978) started as the editor-in-chief, where she remains to this day. Born in Chur, she studied German literature, economics, and political science. She worked as a freelance journalist, and from 2013 served as editor-in-chief of the Bündner Tagblatt (de). Today more than 100 persons from 14 nations are working for swissinfo.ch.

Special features 
swissinfo.ch's themed dossiers offer a high-quality complement to its websites. Produced specifically for an international audience, these multimedia dossiers examine and present current issues in detail. There is also a special section for expatriate Swiss that gives information on forthcoming referendums and elections. swissinfo.ch is also active on different social media channels: Facebook, Twitter, Instagram, YouTube, etc.

Services 
In addition to the websites, information can be called up from or downloaded to mobile devices. The headline service automatically updates computer desktop headlines from the swissinfo.ch homepages. Headlines can also be linked via live news feeds directly to other websites. In March 2017 swissinfo.ch launched a new app (for iOS and Android).

See also 
 Presence Switzerland

References

External links

1995 establishments in Switzerland
Internet properties established in 1995
Swiss Broadcasting Corporation
International broadcasters
Multilingual websites